Odd Fellows lodge is a lodge (and/or building) of the Odd Fellows fraternity.

As a name, it may refer to:

United States 
IOOF Lodge (Alton, Kansas), listed on the National Register of Historic Places in Osborne County, Kansas
 Odd Fellows Lodge (Bel Air, Maryland), listed on the NRHP in Maryland
 Odd Fellows Lodge and Temple, listed on the NRHP in New York
IOOF Lodge (Thompson Falls, Montana), listed on the National Register of Historic Places in Sanders County, Montana
 Odd Fellows Lodge (Goldsboro, North Carolina), listed on the NRHP in North Carolina

See also
List of Odd Fellows buildings
 Odd Fellows Hall (disambiguation)

Odd Fellowship